The 1996 Clásica de Almería was the 11th edition of the Clásica de Almería cycle race and was held on 17 February 1996. The race was won by Wilfried Nelissen.

General classification

References

1996
1996 in road cycling
1996 in Spanish sport